Zabrus chalceus is a species of ground beetle in the Eutroctes subgenus that can be found in Armenia and Turkey.

References

Beetles described in 1836
Beetles of Asia
Zabrus